Sobha Limited (formerly Sobha Developers Limited) is an Indian multinational real estate developer headquartered in Bangalore, India

History

Sobha Limited was founded on 7 August 1995 by P. N. C. Menon. The company has also executed projects for some of India's corporate houses, including Infosys, Wipro, HCLTech, Dell, Robert Bosch GmbH, Biocon, Taj Hotels and ITC Hotels. The company is also planning to invest  crore residential development in Gujarat International Finance Tec-City (GIFT City).

The company changed its name to "Sobha Limited" on 18th August 2014.

They have achieved growth with backward integration in the construction and real estate development business in India. Their long-term performance has been supported by the in-house production of construction items and furniture. The company has a geographic presence in 27 cities in 14 states. Internationally, Sobha Ltd has operations running in Oman and Dubai as Sobha Realty.

References

Real estate companies of India
Companies based in Bangalore
Indian companies established in 1995
1995 establishments in Karnataka
Real estate companies established in 1995
Companies listed on the National Stock Exchange of India
Companies listed on the Bombay Stock Exchange